"Monterey" is the fourth single from Canadian country singer Dean Brody's album Gypsy Road. The song was released to radio in March 2016.

Background
Prior to the single's official release, "Monterey" was released before the album's release to iTunes as a promotional single.

Chart performance

References

2015 songs
2016 singles
Dean Brody songs
Songs written by Dean Brody
Open Road Recordings singles